Latitudinarians, or latitude men, were initially a group of 17th-century English theologiansclerics and academicsfrom the University of Cambridge who were moderate Anglicans (members of the Church of England). In particular, they believed that adhering to very specific doctrines, liturgical practices, and church organizational forms, as did the Puritans, was not necessary and could be harmful: "The sense that one had special instructions from God made individuals less amenable to moderation and compromise, or to reason itself." Thus, the latitudinarians supported a broad-based (sensu lato, with "laxitude") Protestantism. They were later referred to as broad church (see also Inclusivism).

Examples of the latitudinarian philosophy underlying the theology were found among the Cambridge Platonists and Sir Thomas Browne in his Religio Medici. Additionally, the term latitudinarian has been applied to ministers of the Scottish Episcopal Church who were educated at the Episcopal-sympathizing universities at Aberdeen and StAndrews, and who broadly subscribed to the beliefs of their moderate Anglican English counterparts.

Today, latitudinarianism should not be confused with ecumenical movements, which seek to draw all Christian churches together, rather than seeking to de-emphasize practical doctrine. The term latitudinarian has taken on a more general meaning, indicating a personal philosophy that includes tolerance of other views, particularly, but not necessarily, on religious matters.

In the Roman Catholic Church, latitudinarianism was condemned in the 19th-century document Quanta cura. Pope Pius IX felt that, with its emphasis on religious liberty and the freedom to discard traditional Christian doctrines and dogmas, latitudinarianism threatened to undermine the church.

Original meaning
The latitudinarian Anglicans of the 17thcentury built on Richard Hooker's position in Of the Laws of Ecclesiastical Polity. Hooker (1554–1600) argues that what God cares about is the moral state of the individual soul. Aspects such as church leadership are "things indifferent". However, the latitudinarians took a position far beyond Hooker's own and extended it to doctrinal matters.

As a positive position, the latitudinarian view held that human reason, when combined with the Holy Spirit, is a sufficient guide for the determination of truth in doctrinal contests; therefore, legal and doctrinal rulings that constrain reason and the freedom of the believer were neither necessary nor beneficial. At the time, their position was referred to as an aspect of low church (in contrast to the high church position). Later, the latitudinarian position was called broad church.

While always officially opposed by the Anglican church, the latitudinarian philosophy was, nevertheless, dominant in 18th-century England. Because of the Hanoverian reluctance  to act in church affairs, and the various groups of the religious debates being balanced against one another, the dioceses became tolerant of variation in local practice. Furthermore, after George I of Great Britain dismissed the Convocation, there was very little internal Church power to either sanction or approve.

Thus, with no Archbishop of Canterbury officially announcing it, nor Lords adopting it, latitudinarianism was the operative philosophy of the English church in the 18th century. For the 18th-century English church in the United States (which would become the Episcopal Church after the American Revolution), some are of the opinion that latitudinarianism was the only practical course because the nation had official pluralism, diversity of opinion, and diffusion of clerical power.

See also

Anglo-Catholic
Antinomianism
Bangorian Controversy
Liberal Christianity
John Tillotson

References

Anglicanism
Christian terminology
Anglican Churchmanship